Alexandre Valério, known as Kanú (born 5 March 1992) is a Brazilian footballer who is currently a free agent.

Club career
He made his Primeira Liga debut for Vitória de Guimarães on 5 January 2013 in a game against Gil Vicente.

Honours
Vitória de Guimarães
Taça de Portugal: 2012–13

References

1992 births
Living people
People from Arapongas
Sportspeople from Paraná (state)
Brazilian footballers
Association football defenders
F.C. Vizela players
Vitória S.C. B players
Vitória S.C. players
GD Bragança players
Liga Portugal 2 players
Primeira Liga players
Brazilian expatriate footballers
Brazilian expatriate sportspeople in Portugal
Expatriate footballers in Portugal